{{DISPLAYTITLE:C33H40N2O9}}
The molecular formula C33H40N2O9 (molar mass: 608.67 g/mol, exact mass: 608.2734 u) may refer to:

 Methoserpidine
 Reserpine

Molecular formulas